is the 10th single by Japanese idol girl group Nogizaka46. It was released on October 8, 2014. It debuted in number one on the weekly Oricon Singles Chart and, as of October 20, 2014 (issue date), has sold 478,888 copies. It also reached number one on the Billboard Japan Hot 100. It was the 8th best-selling single of the year in Japan, with 578,174 copies.

Release 
This single was released in 4 versions. Type-A, Type-B, Type-C, and a regular edition. The center position in the choreography for the title song is held by Erika Ikuta. She temporally suspended her activities to prepare for college and resumed from this single.

Track listing

Type-A

Type-B

Type-C

Regular Edition

Chart and certifications

Weekly charts

Year-end charts

Certifications

References

Further reading

External links
 Discography  on Nogizaka46 Official Website 
 
 Nogizaka46 Movie Digest on YouTube

2014 singles
2014 songs
Japanese-language songs
Nogizaka46 songs
Oricon Weekly number-one singles
Billboard Japan Hot 100 number-one singles
Songs with lyrics by Yasushi Akimoto